Billavaka is a village in Rowthulapudi Mandal, Kakinada district in the state of Andhra Pradesh in India.

Geography 

Demographics 
 India census, Billavaka had a population of 50, out of which 34 were male and 16 were female. Population of children below 6 years of age were 2. The literacy rate of the village is 49.92%.

References 

Villages in Rowthulapudi mandal